"Ivory Tower" is a popular song written by Jack Fulton and Lois Steele. Popular versions by Cathy Carr and Gale Storm, and a rhythm & blues version by Otis Williams all received major popularity in 1956.

Recorded versions
Cathy Carr (1956) went to number 2 on the Top 100. Overseas, the her version achieved number 2 on the Australian chart.
Hank Locklin
Gale Storm (1956) went to number 6 on the Billboard pop charts
Porter Wagoner
Otis Williams and the Charms (1956) reached number 5 on Billboard's R&B chart and number 11 on the pop chart.
Connie Francis

References

1956 songs
Number-one singles in Australia
Fraternity Records singles
Songs written by Jack Fulton